Travnik (Cyrillic: Травник) is a Slavic place name, originally meaning 'meadow'. It may refer to:

In Bosnia-Herzegovina:
 Travnik, a city and municipality in central Bosnia-Herzegovina
 Novi Travnik, a town and municipality in central Bosnia-Herzegovina

In Bulgaria:
 Travnik, Bulgaria

In Slovakia:
 Trávnik, a village and municipality in the Komarno District, southwest Slovakia

In Slovenia:
 Travnik, Loški Potok, a village in the Municipality of Loški Potok, Slovenia
 Travnik, Cerkno, a small settlement in the Municipality of Cerkno, Slovenia
 Travnik, Semič, an abandoned settlement in the Municipality of Semič, Slovenia
 Travnik, a mountain near Trenta, Bovec and next the Italian border

Other:
 NK Travnik (Nogometni Klub Travnik), a football club in Travnik, Bosnia-Herzegovina
 , a steamship in service 1958–65
 Some local toponyms into Friuli region, Italy, especially in the slavic-speaking area, are referred as "Traunich" or "Traunigh" which has been also a local family nickname/surname. In Gorizia there was a "Piazza del Traunich" ("Meadow's square").

See also 
 Trávnica
 Trávníček